Ciocan is a Romanian surname, literally meaning 'hammer'. It can refer to:

Constantin Ciocan, Romanian cyclist
Ieremia Ciocan, Romanian priest and politician
Ion Ciocan, Romanian politician
Iurie Ciocan, Moldovan politician and professor

See also
Ciocanu
Ciocana, a sector in Chișinău

Romanian-language surnames